This is a list of songs recorded or performed by Begum Akhtar (1914–1974), an Indian singer of Hindustani classical music. Akhtar, who was also an actress, was proficient at dadra, thumri, and ghazals. Cited as "one of India's finest ghazal singers", she was referred to as Mallika-E-Tarannum or Mallika-e-Ghazal (Queen of Ghazals). Akhtar's first recording was a combination of ghazals and dadras for the HMV label. She recorded or performed a total of 167 songs during her career, among which twenty were for films.

Akhtar's performances were in the nature of a classical presentation, with the accompaniment of the tabla, sitar, and harmonium. Her rendering of Ghalib's ghazals made her a household name.

Born Akhtaribai Faizabadi, she begaan her career as a mehfil singer and became famous when she sang at the Bihar earthquake music conference in 1934. On the basis of her popularity, she received offers to appear in films, starting her career with Ek Din Ka Badshah and Nal Damayanti (1933), produced by the East India Company, in Calcutta. In 1942, Akhtar was cast by Mehboob Khan in the film Roti, in which she both sang and acted. In 1945, she married Ishtiaq Ahmed Abbasi, Nawab of Kakoli, putting her career on hold for five years. She returned to film with Dana Pani (1953) and Ehsan (1954). After 1956, Akhtar stopped working in film but continued performing on stage. Her repertoire included the ghazals of Mirza Ghalib, Momin, Faiz Ahmed Faiz, Jigar Moradabadi, Shakeel Badayuni, Mir Taqi Mir, Sauda, and Shamim Jaipuri.

Non-film

Poets

Other

Bengali

Gujarati

Film

References

External links
 
 Selected discography – 78 RPM records of Begum Akhtar (1914–1974)

Lists of songs recorded by Indian singers